Joe Pearson was a Democratic member of the Indiana House of Representatives, representing the 31st District from 2009 to 2011. He farmed full-time until March 1995, when then–Governor Evan Bayh and Lt. Governor Frank O'Bannon named him Assistant Commissioner of Agriculture. He continued to serve in the same capacity for Governor O’Bannon and Governor Joe Kernan through 2005, then ran unsuccessfully for Secretary of State of Indiana in 2006.

External links
Indiana State Legislature - Representative Joe Pearson official government website
Profile at Project Vote Smart
Follow the Money - Joe Pearson
2008 campaign contributions, State Representative
2006 campaign contributions, Indiana Secretary of State

Democratic Party members of the Indiana House of Representatives

Living people
Year of birth missing (living people)